Car adapter may refer to:
Cigarette lighter receptacle
Trailer lighting connector